The Georgian Foundation for Strategic and International Studies also known as Rondeli Foundation (GFSIS) is one of Georgia's leading independent think tanks, based in Tbilisi. It was founded in 1998 with the declared aim of "helping improve public policy decision-making in Georgia through research and analysis, training of policymakers and policy analysts, and public education about the strategic issues, both domestic and international, facing Georgia and the Caucasus". It has played an important role in training new public servants and scholars.

The GFSIS includes several leading experts on politics, social studies, and economics in Georgia, many of them with experience as former high-ranking government officials and strong ties with the country's top education institutions, such as Alexander Rondeli, Temuri Yakobashvili, Vladimer Papava, Merab Kakulia, and Archil Gegeshidze.

References 

Think tanks based in Georgia (country)
Think tanks established in 1998
1998 establishments in Georgia (country)
Political and economic think tanks based in Europe